Crouse-Hinds Electric Company, a manufacturer of high grade electrical specialties, was established in 1897 in Syracuse, New York. They later shortened their name to Crouse-Hinds Company and beginning in the early 1920s specialized in the manufacture of traffic signals, controllers and accessories. The company name remained in use as a subsidiary of Cooper Industries; however, the traffic signal production ended in 1981 after Cooper sold the traffic products division. It is now a division under Eaton Corporation.

Operating divisions

The company's 1980 annual report listed and described the divisions on pages 49–51.
Other than Belden (see below) they were:

Construction Materials Products - Electrical fittings, panelboards, switches, motor starters, control devices, instruments, enclosures, connectors and industrial lighting fixtures. 
Distribution Equipment Products - Load centers, circuit breakers, safety switches, meter sockets and group metering equipment.
Lighting Products - Indoor/outdoor lighting equipment, aviation ground lighting, obstruction lighting and lighting poles.
Traffic Control Products - Vehicle and pedestrian traffic signals and controls and vehicle detectors.
Arrow Hart - Electrical wiring devices, specialty switches and industrial control equipment for commercial and industrial use.(Acquired 1975)

References

External links 
Eaton Crouse-Hinds
Crouse-Hinds Traffic Signals

Defunct companies based in Syracuse, New York
Defunct companies based in New York (state)
Manufacturing companies established in 1897
Manufacturing companies disestablished in 1981
1897 establishments in New York (state)
1981 disestablishments in New York (state)